Grzegorz Ryś (born 9 February 1964) is a Polish Roman Catholic bishop, being the archbishop of the Roman Catholic Archdiocese of  Łódź since 2017. He was previously an auxiliary bishop of the Archdiocese of Kraków and titular bishop of Arcavica from 2011 to 2017. He also served as an apostolic administrator of the Diocese of Kalisz from 2020 to 2021.

Biography

Early life
Ryś was born on 9 February 1964 in Krakow. In the years 1982–1988 he studied at the Faculty of Theology and the Faculty of History of the Church of the Pontifical Academy of Theology in Krakow, as well as at the Major Seminary of the Archdiocese of Krakow.  He was ordained a priest on 22 May 1988 in the Wawel Cathedral by Cardinal Franciszek Macharski, then the Metropolitan Archbishop of Kraków. In 1994 Ryś earned a doctorate in theological sciences based on the dissertation Medieval folk piety in Poland. In 2000, based on the dissertation on Jan Hus in the face of the crisis of the Church of the Reformation, Ryś obtained post-doctoral degree in the field of history.

Priestly ministry
From 1988 to 1989 Ryś worked as a vicar in the parish of Saints Margaret and Catherine in Kęty. From 2004 to 2007 he was the director of the Archives of the Metropolitan Chapter in Krakow. He was also a commentator on the pilgrimages of John Paul II on Polish Television and Polish Radio. After the latter's death, Ryś co-organized vigils, while during the beatification process he sat on the historical commission of the Rogatory Tribunal.

He became the head of the Department of Church History in the Middle Ages and the Department of Ancient and Medieval History at the Institute of History at the Faculty of History and Cultural Heritage of the Pontifical University of John Paul II (formerly the Pontifical Academy of Theology). In the years 2007 to 2011 Ryś was the rector of the Major Seminary of the Archdiocese of Krakow, in addition, in the years 2010 to 2011 he was the chairman of the Conference of Rectors of Theological Seminary in Poland.

Auxiliary Bishop of Kraków
On 16 July 2011, Ryś was appointed by Pope Benedict XVI as auxiliary bishop of the Archdiocese of Kraków as well as the titular bishop of Arcavica. He was ordained an episcopate on 28 September 2011 in the Wawel Cathedral, with the consecrator being Cardinal Stanisław Dziwisz, metropolitan archbishop of Kraków, and co-consecrators cardinals Franciszek Macharski, archbishop emeritus of Kraków, and Stanisław Ryłko, chairman of the Pontifical Council for the Laity. Ryś chose "Virtus in infirmitate" (Power in Weakness) as his bishop's motto.

Archbishop of Łódź
On 14 September 2017 Pope Francis appointed Ryś archbishop of Łódź. He was installed as archbishop in the Archcathedral Basilica of St. Stanislaus Kostka on 4 November 2017. On 29 June 2018 was given his pallium in a ceremony at St. Peter's Basilica in Rome, and it was imposed on him on 5 October 2018 in the Łódź cathedral by Archbishop Salvatore Pennacchio, the Apostolic Nuncio in Poland.

In 2018 Ryś convened the fourth synod in the history of the Archdiocese of Łódź on the question of introducing the permanent diaconate to combat the shortage of priests. In 2019 he introduced the permanent diaconate in the archdiocese, and also created the International Diocesan Missionary Seminary for the new Evangelization of Redemptoris Mater for seminarians who are part of the Neocatechumenal Way.

On 25 June 2020 Ryś was appointed by Pope Francis as the Apostolic Administrator sede plena for the Diocese of Kalisz while Bishop Edward Janiak was investigated on charges he had protected "predator priests" who engaged in acts of sex abuse. He was named Apostolic Administrator sede vacante when Pope Francis accepted Janiak's resignation on 17 October 2020. His mission ended as the new bishop of Kalisz, Damian Bryl, was installed.

On 21 November 2020, Pope Francis named him as a member of the Congregation for Bishops.

References

External links

Website 

1964 births
Living people
Bishops of Kraków
21st-century Roman Catholic archbishops in Poland
Clergy from Kraków
Members of the Congregation for Bishops